Francisco Segalá (14 March 1906 – 12 December 1963) was a Spanish swimmer. He competed in the men's 4 × 200 metre freestyle relay event at the 1928 Summer Olympics.

References

External links
 

1906 births
1963 deaths
Spanish male freestyle swimmers
Olympic swimmers of Spain
Swimmers at the 1928 Summer Olympics
Place of birth missing